HP Slate is a small line of HP consumer tablets and All-in-Ones.

Models

Slate 500 

HP Slate 500 - is a Intel Atom-based 8.9" Tablet PC, 2010.

Slate 6 
HP Slate 6 - is a 6" Android smartphone.

Slate 6 VoiceTab 
2014 model.

Slate 6 VoiceTab 2 
2015 update.

Slate 7 

HP Slate 7 — is a ARM-based 7" Android tablet, 2013.  It has a stainless-steel frame, black front, and gray or red soft-touch back.

Slate 10

Pro Slate 12 
HP Pro Slate 12 — is a 12" ARM-based Android tablet with pen input option, 2015

Slate 17 
HP Slate 17 —is a Intel Celeron-based 17" Android tablet/All-in-One, 2014

Slate 21 

HP Slate 21 — ARM-based 21.5" All-in-One computer, 2013.

HP Slate 21 Pro — Small-business thin client with Citrix Receiver preinstalled.

See also
HP Stream

References

HP Slate
Android (operating system) devices